Apopudobalia (ἀπο- + ποδός + ball + -ία) is a fictional sport which was the subject of a famous fictitious entry (humorous hoax or copyright trap in a reference work). Although no such sport actually existed, the German-language Der neue Pauly Enzyklopaedie der Antike, edited by H. Cancik and H. Schneider, vol. 1 (Stuttgart, 1996) gives a  description of it as an ancient Greco-Roman sport that anticipates modern soccer. The article goes on to cite suitably sparse documentation for the non-existent sport (this includes a Festschrift to one M. Sammer), and to assert that a Roman form of the game enjoyed a certain popularity amongst the Roman legions, and consequently spread throughout the Empire as far afield as Britain, "where the game enjoyed a revival in the 19th century." (It also notes that the game was frowned upon by some early Christian writers, such as Tertullian.)

In reality, the ancient Romans did play a game resembling rugby called harpastum.

External links
 A facsimile of the article, accompanied by a mock review by two classical scholars and another piece in which Wolfgang Hübner discusses the review.

Fictitious entries
Fictional ball games
Hoaxes in Germany
1986 hoaxes